Al Ater was an American farmer and politician in Louisiana. He served in the Louisiana House of Representatives and as Louisiana Secretary of State.

He served in the Louisiana House from 1984 until 1992. He was a Democrat. He was Louisiana's Secretary of State during Hurricane Katrina and its aftermath. He had a wife Susie and three children.

References

2017 deaths
Members of the Louisiana House of Representatives
1953 births